The 1974 SCCA Formula Super Vee season was the fourth season of the Sports Car Club of America sanctioned Formula Super Vee championship. This season marked the first season of the second generation of the Formula Super Vee. One of the innovations was the introduction of slick tyres. As of 1974 not all of the series races were sanctioned by the SCCA, seven rounds were sanctioned by the International Motor Sports Association.

Race calendar and results

Final standings

References

SCCA Formula Super Vee